Te Rangiātaahua Kiniwē Royal  (1896–1965) was a notable New Zealand tribal leader, land officer, Māori welfare officer, soldier, and sportsman. Of Māori descent, he identified with the Ngāti Raukawa and Ngāti Tamaterā iwi. He was born in Muhunoa, Manawatū, New Zealand, in 1896.

During the Battle of Crete, leading two companies of the Māori Battalion, he overran the advance of the I Battalion, 141st Gebirgsjäger Regiment allowing the 5th New Zealand Brigade to escape. Once everyone was safe, he led a retreat 24 miles (39 km), allowing only two men to be killed, and eight wounded, all of whom were recovered.

In the 1964 New Year Honours, Royal was appointed an Officer of the Order of the British Empire, for services to the Māori people.

References

Further reading
 

1896 births
1965 deaths
New Zealand Māori sportspeople
New Zealand Army personnel
Ngāti Raukawa people
Ngāti Tamaterā people
New Zealand Māori public servants
New Zealand Māori soldiers
People educated at Thames High School
New Zealand recipients of the Military Cross
New Zealand Officers of the Order of the British Empire
New Zealand military personnel of World War II